Dennis  Williamson is a former professional rugby league footballer who played in the 1950s and 1960s.

Playing career

Challenge Cup Final appearances
Dennis Williamson played right-, i.e. number 12, in Wakefield Trinity’s 12-6 victory over Huddersfield in the 1961–62 Challenge Cup Final during the 1961–62 season at Wembley Stadium, London on Saturday 12 May 1962.

References

External links

Search for "Williamson" at rugbyleagueproject.org
Wakefield Win Cup 1962

Living people
English rugby league players
Place of birth missing (living people)
Rugby league second-rows
Wakefield Trinity players
Whitehaven R.L.F.C. players
Year of birth missing (living people)